Traître may refer to:

Le Traitre, pamphlet by Jacques Bahar 1898
Le Traître, novel by André Gorz 1958 
Baie des Traitres
"Traîtres", song by Lacrim 2017